Commentary on Romans is a commentary of Epistle to the Romans written before 410 by British ascetic Pelagius. It is Pelagius' longest extant work. 

Reception
In 412, Augustine read Pelagius' Commentary on Romans and described its author as a "highly advanced Christian", although he disagreed with Pelagius' exegesis of Romans 5:12, which he believed downplayed original sin.

References

Sources

Further reading

Pelagianism
5th-century manuscripts
Epistle to the Romans